The 2017 Transplant Games were a multi-sport event held from 25 June to 2 July 2017 in Málaga, Spain. They were the 21st edition of the World Transplant Games.

The Games were organized by the World Transplant Games Federation (WTGF).

Participating nations

Sports

Individual sports 

  Athletics
  Road race (5 km)
  Badminton
  Bowling
  Cycling
  Darts
  Golf
  Kayak
  Swimming
  Paddle tennis
  Pétanque
  Squash
  Table tennis
  Tennis
  Triathlon

Team sports 
  Basketball (3 on 3)
  Volleyball

Medal table
Medals were awarded to the following countries:

References

External links 

Multi-sport events in Spain
Sport in Málaga
World Transplant Games
2017 in Spanish sport
June 2017 sports events in Europe
July 2017 sports events in Europe
2017 in multi-sport events